The men's team pursuit race of the 2014–15 ISU Speed Skating World Cup 1, arranged in the Meiji Hokkaido-Tokachi Oval, in Obihiro, Japan, was held on 15 November 2014.

The Dutch team won the race, while the South Korean team came second, and the Russian team came third.

Results
The race took place on Saturday, 15 November, in the afternoon session, scheduled at 16:23.

References

Men team pursuit
1